Dora Gorman (born 18 February 1993) is an Irish physician and Republic of Ireland women's international footballer who plays as a midfielder for Peamount United of the Women's National League (WNL). In 2010, she was captain of the Republic of Ireland U-17 squad who were runners-up in the 2010 UEFA Women's Under-17 Championship and quarter-finalists in the 2010 FIFA U-17 Women's World Cup. As well as being a medical doctor, Gorman is an all-round sportswoman. She has also represented the Ireland women's national field hockey team at various levels and has played senior inter-county ladies' Gaelic football for the Galway county team.

Early years
Gorman grew up in Barna, County Galway and is the daughter of Michael and Margaret Gorman. She attended Dominican College, Taylor's Hill, Galway where she studied for her Leaving Cert. In 2011, she was awarded a medal for achieving the joint highest mark in the Leaving Certificate Physics Examination in the Republic of Ireland. While still at school, Gorman played association football with Salthill Devon, Gaelic football with Salthill-Knocknacarra GAA and field hockey with Greenfields Hockey Club.
Gorman represented Galway GAA at under-12, under-14 and under-16 levels. In July 2010 Gorman played for Galway in the All-Ireland Under-18 Ladies' Football Championship final, scoring 1–1 as she helped them defeat a Donegal GAA team that featured Ciara Grant. Together with Julie-Ann Russell, Gorman also played Gaelic football for Galway at senior level in the Ladies' National Football League. Gorman also played for the Ireland women's national field hockey team at under-16 and under-18 level as well as for the development A team. She was initially selected to represent Ireland at the 2010 Summer Youth Olympics but subsequently had to withdraw due to other sporting commitments.

Club career

Salthill Devon
In 2007, together with Julie-Ann Russell, Gorman was a member of the Salthill Devon team that won the Under 16 Girls FAI Cup. In the final at Tolka Park, Salthill Devon  defeated Stella Maris 3–2 after extra–time. In 2008 Gorman and Salthill Devon retained the cup after defeating St Joseph's 6–0 in final. In 2010 
Gorman was also a member of the Salthill Devon squad that reached the FAI Women's Cup final, although she did not play the final itself.

Peamount United
Between 2011 and 2014 Gorman played for Peamount United in the Women's National League. She played for United during 2011–12 UEFA Women's Champions League campaign and during the inaugural 2011–12 Women's National League season. Gorman scored twice during the regular season as United won the title, finishing three points clear of second placed Raheny United. United also completed a league double by winning the WNL Cup. Gorman missed much of 2012–13 season because of injury but returned in 2013–14 to help United finish as league runners-up.

UCD Waves
In 2011 Gorman began studying medicine at University College Dublin. Gorman also played association football for UCD at intervarsity level, playing in teams alongside Julie-Ann Russell, Siobhán Killeen and Ciara Grant. In the 2013–14 season Gorman helped UCD win the WSCAI Premier Division. In 2014–15 when UCD Waves entered a team in the Women's National League, they also appointed the former Peamount United manager Eileen Gleeson to take charge of the team. Gorman was one of several United players to follow Gleeson to Waves. Others included Aine O'Gorman, Karen Duggan, Julie-Ann Russell, Chloe Mustaki and Emily Cahill. Gorman also played for the UCD ladies hockey team that won the 2012 Irish Senior Cup. Her teammates included Chloe Watkins, Deirdre Duke and Anna O'Flanagan. She graduated with her medical degree in 2018 and began working at the Mater Hospital, but her sporting activities had already been put on hold for more than a year while she attended work placements in England and America. In 2019 she played Gaelic football for Galway.

Return to Peamount
In November 2020, Gorman made a playing comeback with Peamount United. She was a 77th-minute substitute for Niamh Farrelly in a 3–0 home win over Cork City. It was her first appearance in the Women's National League for more than four years.

International career
Gorman has represented the Republic of Ireland at under-15, under-17, under-19, university and senior level. In 2010 Gorman captained a Republic of Ireland U-17 squad that featured Megan Campbell, Siobhán Killeen, Denise O'Sullivan, Ciara Grant and  Clare Shine and finished as runners-up in the 2010 UEFA Women's Under-17 Championship and quarter-finalists in the 2010 FIFA U-17 Women's World Cup. Gorman made her senior international debut on 22 October 2011, in a UEFA Women's Euro 2013 qualifier against Israel at Tallaght Stadium. She created the Republic of Ireland's second goal for Ciara Grant a minute after coming on as an 86th-minute substitute. In December 2011, together with Julie-Ann Russell, Louise Quinn, Grace Murray,  Karen Duggan, Megan Campbell and Ciara Grant, Gorman was included in an FAI scholarship programme for potential senior women's internationals. Gorman has subsequently represented the Republic of Ireland during their 2015 FIFA Women's World Cup and UEFA Women's Euro 2017 qualifying campaigns. Gorman also represented Ireland at the 2013 and 2015 Summer Universiades.

Honours

Association football
Individual
FAI International Football Awards Under-17 Women's International Player of the Year
 2009 
Peamount United 
 Women's National League
Winners: 2011–12: 1
Runners-up: 2012–13, 2013–14: 2
 WNL Cup
 Winners: 2012, 2013: 2
UCD Waves/UCD
Women's National League
Runners-up: 2014–15: 1
FAI Women's Cup
Runners-up: 2014: 1
WNL Cup
Runners-up: 2016: 1
WSCAI Premier Division
Winners: 2013–14: 1 
Salthill Devon
Under 16 Girls FAI Cup
 Winners: 2007, 2008: 2
Republic of Ireland U-17 
UEFA Women's Under-17 Championship
Runner Up: 2010

Gaelic football
Individual
 Connacht Young Player of the Year
 2008 
 Galway
All-Ireland Under-18 Ladies' Football Championship
Winners:  2010

Field Hockey
Individual
 IHA U-18 Player of the Year
 2010  
UCD
Irish Senior Cup
 2012

References

1993 births
Living people
Association footballers from County Galway
Republic of Ireland women's association footballers
Republic of Ireland women's international footballers
Salthill Devon F.C. players
Peamount United F.C. players
DLR Waves players
Women's National League (Ireland) players
Salthill-Knocknacarra Gaelic footballers
Galway inter-county ladies' footballers
Ladies' Gaelic footballers who switched code
Irish female field hockey players
Alumni of University College Dublin
Women's association football midfielders
UCD Ladies' Hockey Club players
UCD Women's Soccer Club players
21st-century Irish medical doctors
Irish women medical doctors
Republic of Ireland women's youth international footballers